Gildersome West railway station served the village of Gildersome, West Yorkshire, England, from 1856 to 1968 on the Leeds, Bradford and Halifax Junction Railway.

History 
The station opened as Gildersome on 20 August 1856 by the Leeds, Bradford and Halifax Junction Railway. Its name was changed to Gildersome West on 2 March 1951 to avoid confusion with another station of the same name further north. The station closed to passengers on 13 June 1955 and closed to goods in 1968.

References

External links 

Disused railway stations in West Yorkshire
Railway stations opened in 1856
Railway stations closed in 1955
1856 establishments in England
1968 disestablishments in England
Railway stations in Great Britain opened in the 19th century